Lyricist Lounge 2 is the second installment in Rawkus Records Lyricist Lounge album series. The release was one of Rawkus' most commercially successful releases, featuring the hit crossover singles, "Oh No" and "Get Up", the former charting on the Billboard Hot 100 and topping the Billboard Rap chart. Despite its success, Lyricist Lounge 2 drew criticisms from underground fans, mainly due to the album's more commercial sound, and also because of its focus on established artists, unlike the first installment, which largely featured up-and-coming MC's.

The album features appearances from Mos Def, Pharoahe Monch, Q-Tip, Wordsworth, Cocoa Brovaz, Beanie Sigel, Royce da 5'9", Ghostface Killah, Saukrates, Redman, Talib Kweli, dead prez, Kool G Rap, M.O.P., Big Noyd, Prodigy, Erick Sermon, Sy Scott, Planet Asia, Punchline, Cobra Red, Phil Da Agony, C-Town, Dilated Peoples, Master Fuol, JT Money, Pastor Troy, and Macy Gray, as well as late hip hop legends The Notorious B.I.G., Big L, Guru, and Nate Dogg.

Track listing

Album Chart Positions

Singles Chart Positions

References 

2000 compilation albums
Rawkus Records compilation albums
Albums produced by the Alchemist (musician)
Albums produced by Ayatollah
Albums produced by Hi-Tek
Albums produced by DJ Premier
Albums produced by Nottz
Albums produced by Rockwilder
Lyricist Lounge
Record label compilation albums
Hip hop compilation albums
Sequel albums